The 2019 Arctic Race of Norway was a four-stage cycling stage race that took place in Norway between 15 and 18 August. It was the seventh edition of the Arctic Race of Norway and is rated as a 2.HC event as part of the UCI Europe Tour.

Schedule

Teams 

Twenty teams of up to six riders were invited to take part in the race. Of these teams, four were UCI WorldTeams, thirteen were UCI Professional Continental teams, and three were UCI Continental teams.

UCI WorldTeams

 
 
 
 

UCI Professional Continental Teams

 
 
 
 
 
 
 
 
 
 
 
 
 

UCI Continental Teams

 Joker Fuel of Norway

Stages

Stage 1
15 August 2019 – Å to Leknes,

Stage 2
16 August 2019 – Henningsvær to Svolvær,

Stage 3
17 August 2019 – Sortland to Melbu (Storheia Summit),

Stage 4
18 August 2019 – Lødingen to Narvik,

Classifications 

The race included four main classifications: the general classification (represented by a yellow and orange jersey), the points classification (represented by a green jersey), the mountains classification (represented by a salmon jersey) and the youth classification (represented by a white jersey). There was also an award for the most aggressive rider on each stage and a team classification.

Classification standings

General classification

Points classification

Mountains classification

Young rider classification

Teams classification

References

External links 
 

Arctic Race of Norway
Arctic Race of Norway
Arctic Race of Norway
Arctic Race of Norway